The 2nd Royal Tank Regiment (2 RTR) was an armoured regiment of the British Army. It was part of the Royal Tank Regiment, itself part of the Royal Armoured Corps and the 1st Mechanized Brigade.

History

Founded as B Battalion, Tank Corps in 1917, the 2 RTR first saw action in the First World War with the advent of tank technology. It later fought in the Second World War. In 1992, it merged with the 3rd Royal Tank Regiment, keeping their own original title. It became the second regiment to be equipped with the Challenger 2 in 1998.

Sabre squadrons were deployed by the regiment to Iraq on Operation Telic in 2003 and 2007. After a long period in Fallingbostel, Germany, the regiment moved back to Aliwal Barracks in Tidworth in July 2007. On 25 June 2008 at Buckingham Palace, both 1RTR and 2RTR were presented with their new Standard by The Queen, which included the new Battle Honour of Al Basrah 2003. 

Units were deployed to Afghanistan on Operation Herrick in 2010.

In August 2014 the regiment merged with 1RTR to form the Royal Tank Regiment. The new regiment is based at Aliwal Barracks in Tidworth and is one of three armoured regiments equipped with the Challenger II tank.

2003 friendly fire incident 
In March 2003 Sergeant Steven Roberts of 2 RTR was shot and killed near Basra in an incident of friendly fire. Another soldier in 2 RTR had been attempting to protect Sergeant Roberts from a stone-wielding Iraqi protester that he was struggling with, who also died. An inquest heard that the soldier responsible was not aware that the machine gun used was inaccurate at short ranges. The inquest found that the shooting was an accident and that Roberts died because the Army failed to provide him with Enhanced Combat Body Armour.

Organisation
The Armoured Regiment consisted of 5 Squadrons:

 Nero Squadron - Headquarters and Support
 Cyclops Squadron - Armoured Squadron
 Badger Squadron - Armoured Squadron
 Egypt Squadron - Armoured Squadron
 Falcon Squadron - Armoured Reconnaissance Squadron

Commanding Officers

The Commanding Officers have been:

|  style="text-align:left; width:50%; vertical-align:top;"|
1958–1960: Lt.-Col. Patrick R.C. Hobart:
1960–1963: Lt.-Col. A.R.E. Davis
1963–1965: Lt.-Col. John G.R. Allen
1965–1967: Lt.-Col. Douglas W.A. Ambidge
1967–1970: Lt.-Col. Thomas S.M. Welch
1970–1973: Lt.-Col. Geoffrey L.D. Duckworth
1973–1975: Lt.-Col. Michael J. Evans
1975–1977: Lt.-Col. Keith R. Ecclestone
1977–1979: Lt.-Col. Peter D. Bentley
1979–1980: Lt.-Col. William S. Bale
1980–1982: Lt.-Col. David A. Williams
1982–1984: Lt.-Col. Robert W.M. McAfee
1984–1987: Lt.-Col. Christopher J.A. Hammerbeck

|  style="text-align:left; width:50%; vertical-align:top;"|

1987–1988: Lt.-Col. David W. Lloyd-Edwards
1988–1991: Lt.-Col. Andrew C.I. Gadsby
1991–1993: Lt.-Col. A. David Leakey
1993–1995: Lt.-Col. Stephen J.B. White
1995–1997: Lt.-Col. Nigel R.F. Aylwin-Foster
1997–2000: Lt.-Col. Simon Caraffi
2000–2002: Lt.-Col. Patrick J. Allison
2002–2004: Lt.-Col. Piers D.P. Hankinson
2004–2006: Lt.-Col. John R. Patterson
2006–2008: Lt.-Col. David A. Catmur
2008–2010: Lt.-Col. T. Marcus L. Simson
2010–2012: Lt.-Col. Marcus H. Evans
2012–2014: Lt.-Col. Jason M. Williams

References

External links 
 Official site
 3RTR – Armoured Farmers
 RTR Website
 British Army Locations from 1945 British Army Locations from 1945.
  Merseyside RTR  (Brian Gills website)

2-002 Royal Tank Regiment
Military units and formations established in 1917
Military units and formations disestablished in 2014